Rossville Middle-Senior High School is a middle school and high school located in Rossville, Indiana. It serves grades 6-12 and is part of the Rossville Consolidated Schools.

Demographics
The demographic breakdown of the 574 students enrolled in 2015-16 was:
Male- 49.7%
Female - 50.3%
Asian - 0.5%
Black - 1.2%
Hispanic - 2.4%
Multiracial - 1.4%
21.8% of the students were eligible for free or reduced-cost lunch.

Athletics
The Rossville Hornets compete in the Hoosier Heartland Conference. The school colors are red and white. The following Indiana High School Athletic Association (IHSAA) sports are offered:

Baseball (boys)
State championship - 2000
Basketball (girls and boys)
Boys state championship - 2002
Cross country (girls and boys)
Golf (girls and boys)
Soccer (girls and boys)
Softball (girls)
Tennis (girls and boys)
Track (girls and boys)
Volleyball (girls)
Wrestling (boys)

See also
 List of high schools in Indiana

References

External links
Official Website

Public high schools in Indiana
Buildings and structures in Clinton County, Indiana
1896 establishments in Indiana